Charles Marc du Boisguehenneuc (1740 — Robuste, 1778) was a French Navy officer. He took part in the First voyage of Kerguelen and served in the War of American Independence. Boisguehenneuc Bay was named in his honour.

Biography 
Du Boisguehenneuc was cousin to Saint Aloüarn. 

Du Boisguehenneuc served as first officer on Gros Ventre, under Saint Aloüarn, and took part in the First voyage of Kerguelen. In 1771, Saint Aloüarn was sick, and Du Boisguehenneuc took command of Gros Ventre for the first part of the expedition, consisting in sailing to India along the new route proposed by Grenier. Gros Ventre and Fortune then sailed South and discovered the Kerguelen Islands on 13 February 1772, and Du Boisguehenneuc went ashore on a boat and claimed the land for France.

He returned to France on Indien.

Sources and references 
 Notes

Citations

Bibliography
 
 

External links
 
 
 

French Navy officers
French military personnel of the American Revolutionary War